Ricardo Jorge Fernandes da Silva (born 29 March 1977) is a Portuguese former footballer who played as a forward.

Club career
Fernandes was born in Agualva-Cacém, Sintra, Lisboa Region. During his career, spent most in the second and third divisions of Portuguese football, he represented Real SC, Vitória de Setúbal (his first Primeira Liga experience), S.C. Olhanense – two spells – Gil Vicente FC, Boavista FC (one more match in the top level), S.C. Freamunde, C.D. Santa Clara, C.D. Olivais e Moscavide – another two stints – G.D. Igreja Nova and Atlético Clube do Cacém (his very first youth club, to where he returned in January 2010 after nearly 25 years).

In 2011, Silva started his coaching career with his last team, still in the regional leagues.

External links

1977 births
Living people
People from Sintra
Portuguese footballers
Association football forwards
Primeira Liga players
Liga Portugal 2 players
Segunda Divisão players
Real S.C. players
Vitória F.C. players
S.C. Olhanense players
Gil Vicente F.C. players
Boavista F.C. players
S.C. Freamunde players
C.D. Santa Clara players
C.D. Olivais e Moscavide players
Sportspeople from Lisbon District